The dorsal intercuneiform ligaments are fibrous bands that connect the dorsal surfaces of the three cuneiform bones.

Ligaments of the lower limb